"Eight Miles High" is a 1966 The Byrds song.

Eight Miles High may also refer to:

 Eight Miles High (album), 1969 Golden Earring album
 Eight Miles High (film), 2007 German film

See also
 Eightmile (disambiguation)